New Trinity Baroque is an ensemble and orchestra with an associated chamber choir, specialised in baroque music played on period instruments. It was founded in 1998 in London but is now based in Atlanta, United States. It is led by harpsichordist and conductor Predrag Gosta.

The orchestra has worked with guest artists such as Florian Deuter, Marijana Mijanovic, John Holloway, Evelyn Tubb, Marion Verbruggen, Leif Aruhn-Solén, Ingrid Matthews, and Michael Fields. They have published several CDs, and have appeared at several international festivals, including the Boston Early Music Festival, Piccolo Spoleto Festival (in Charleston, South Carolina), the Belgrade Early Music Festival in Serbia, Korkyra Baroque Festival in Croatia and Vammala Early Music Festival (Sastamala Gregoriana) in Finland.

Discography

External links 

New Trinity Baroque's home page
Edition Lilac CD label
New Trinity Baroque's recordings at CD BABY

Musical groups established in 1998
Musical groups from Atlanta
American orchestras
Orchestras based in Georgia (U.S. state)
Baroque musicians